Ivan Valeriyovych Trubochkin (born 17 March 1993) is a Ukrainian professional footballer who plays as a right-back for Mynai.

Career
Trubochkin is a product of the Dynamo Kyiv academy and signed 3-and-a-half-years contract with the Ukrainian Premier League club in December 2012.

References

External links
 
 
 

1993 births
Living people
Footballers from Kyiv
Ukrainian footballers
Ukraine youth international footballers
Ukraine under-21 international footballers
Association football defenders
FC Dynamo Kyiv players
FC Dynamo-2 Kyiv players
Umeå FC players
FC Krumkachy Minsk players
FC Arsenal Kyiv players
FC Chornomorets Odesa players
FC Olimpik Donetsk players
FC Dinamo Tbilisi players
FC Dinaz Vyshhorod players
FC Mynai players
Ukrainian Premier League players
Ukrainian First League players
Ukrainian Second League players
Ettan Fotboll players
Belarusian Premier League players
Erovnuli Liga players
Ukrainian expatriate footballers
Expatriate footballers in Sweden
Ukrainian expatriate sportspeople in Sweden
Expatriate footballers in Belarus
Ukrainian expatriate sportspeople in Belarus
Expatriate footballers in Georgia (country)
Ukrainian expatriate sportspeople in Georgia (country)